Guddu Dhanoa is an Indian writer, producer and director. He is mainly known for making Hindi films. He directed several action films, most notably Ziddi, starring Sunny Deol, and Bichhoo, starring Bobby Deol.

Personal life
He is cousin of Bollywood film star Dharmendra.

Career 
He started as a producer for Shahrukh Khan who starred in Dhanoa's 1992 film Deewana. He directed 1997 film Ziddi starring Sunny Deol which was a success at the box office. This commoner turned gangster action flick film did a business of 20 Crore on a budget of Rs 8 Crore and considered a milestone in the career of Dhanoa and Sunny deol. His other Hindi language films as a director includes Elaan (1994)Tu Chor Main Sipahi (1996), Aflatoon (1997), Bichhoo (2000), 23rd March 1931: Shaheed (2002), Hawa (2003), Jaal: The Trap (2003) and Big Brother. In 2011 Ramtaa Jogi (2015) he directed Punjabi language film The Lion of Punjab.

In year 2000, Dhanoa produced and directed a revenge drama film Bichhoo with Bobby Deol and Rani Mukherjee. The film was an unofficial remake of a French film. A sequel of this film was also planned which never went into production. In 2002, he directed 23rd March 1931: Shaheed with Bobby deol playing the lead role of Shaheed Bhagat Singh and Sunny Deol playing freedom fighter Chandra Shekhar Azad. The film clashed at the box office with Legend of Bhagat Singh, another film based on Shaheed Bhagat Singh. 23 March 1931: Shaheed was a box office failure. In the year 2003, he produced and directed a supernatural thriller Hawa, featuring Tabu. The film was heavily inspired from Hollywood film The Entity and received poor reviews. He shot his 2003 film Jaal: the trap in Himanchal Pradesh. During the shooting of this film Indian actor Amrish Puri had a serious accident which caused serious injury to his face and eyes.
Mr Dhanoa has been signed to direct the Hindi remake of Tamil Film S3 (also known as Singam 3). Thakur Anoop Singh is also on board to play the main lead.

Filmography

External links

References

Living people
Hindi-language film directors
Hindi film producers
Indian male writers
Year of birth missing (living people)